The Three guilder coin was a silver coin struck in the Kingdom of the Netherlands between 1817 and 1832.

Description
The obverse featured a portrait of king William I of the Netherlands. On the reverse was a crowned Dutch coat of arms between the value. The coins had a smooth edge with edge lettering ‘GOD ZY MET ONS’. The coins were minted in Utrecht in the years 1817-1824 and 1830-1832. The coins of 1823 were also minted in Brussels. 

The coins were minted from silver .893 and had a diameter of 40  mm and a weight of 32.3  gram.

References

Guilder
Coins of the Netherlands